was a sumo wrestler from Toyama City, Japan. He was known for his techniques, which accommodated his small size. Although his height was only 158 cm, he gave the likes of Hitachiyama and others a real challenge and was called the "mite". He was the shortest wrestler in sumo history, and also one of the lightest at 73 kg. His highest rank was sekiwake. After retirement he was known as Shiratama-oyakata.

Top division record

See also
Glossary of sumo terms
List of past sumo wrestlers

References

External links
 Tournament results

1883 births
1928 deaths
Japanese sumo wrestlers
People from Toyama (city)
Sumo people from Toyama Prefecture
Sekiwake